Benjamin Richard "Yahtzee" Croshaw (born 24 May 1983) is a British comedic writer, author, video game journalist, humorist, podcaster, and video game developer. He is best known for his video game review series Zero Punctuation, which he produces for The Escapist. Before this, Croshaw gained attention in the Adventure Game Studio community for his video game production.

He is involved in multiple other video series and podcasts for The Escapist.

Croshaw has published five novels through Dark Horse Comics: Mogworld, published August 2010, Jam, (October 2012), Will Save the Galaxy for Food (February 2017), Differently Morphous (March 2019) and Will Destroy the Galaxy for Cash (September 2019). A sixth novel, Existentially Challenged (December 2021), has been published as an audiobook.

Starting from Differently Morphous, Croshaw's books were released as Audible exclusives first as audiobooks, with other formats releasing later on. Croshaw also contributed a short story to the Machine of Death (October 2010) compilation.

Croshaw has also been developing video games since 1998, his two commercial releases, Hatfall and The Consuming Shadow, are published across Steam and Humble Bundle.

Outside of writing, Croshaw was one of the four founders of the Mana Bar, an Australian cocktail bar and video gaming lounge which opened in 2010. The Mana Bar closed on 24 May 2015.

Works on The Escapist

Zero Punctuation

Zero Punctuation is a weekly video-review column by Croshaw produced for The Escapist. The series started when Croshaw uploaded two reviews for Fable: The Lost Chapters and The Darkness demo to YouTube, after which The Escapist contacted him to offer a contract. Reviews are released every Wednesday, with Tuesday previews running for a period of time on G4's now-defunct X-Play. Croshaw is best known in this series for his generally scathing reviews of mainstream games, as well as often explicitly vulgar comparisons and rapid-fire speech.

Some of the few games that have actually received favorable reviews are Portal, Psychonauts, Silent Hill2, Call of Duty4: Modern Warfare, Spec Ops: The Line, and Paper Mario: The Thousand-Year Door. The Valve game Portal is the only game he has ever reviewed in a completely positive manner with Portal being rated as one of his favorite games of all time, others being Silent Hill 2, Prince of Persia: The Sands of Time, Shadow of the Colossus, Thief II: The Metal Age, and Dark Souls.

Post-Zero Punctuation streams 
Roughly 4 hours after each weekly Zero Punctuation, Croshaw streams the reviewed game live for two hours with fellow Escapist members on Twitch and Youtube. The hosts showcase and discuss the game in question.

Yahtzee's Dev Diary 
Every Tuesday fortnight, Croshaw hosts Yahtzee's Dev Diary, a video series based on advice for video game design, writing and general creativity. During season one, he developed 12 games in 12 months and during season two, he was developing Starstruck Vagabond as well as sharing general thoughts on game design. The series is currently on hiatus, although an episode of Extra Punctuation did follow up on Starstruck Vagabond.

Slightly Something Else 
Croshaw joins Jack Packard weekly in Slightly Something Else, formerly Slightly Civil War, a live podcast show based on video game related topics.

Ask the Creators 
Croshaw join other Escapist members in a monthly video series called Ask the Creators where they answer audience submitted questions.

Adventure Is Nigh! 
A Dungeons & Dragons campaign as an animated video series starring Croshaw and fellow Escapist members, KC Nwosu, Jack Packard, Amy Campbell & Jesse Galena.

Extra Punctuation 
A supplementary column to Zero Punctuation, released weekly on The Escapist from July 2009 to April 2017. Revived as video series in October 2021, Croshaw broadens his commentary to the general video game industry.

Games
Croshaw became known in the Adventure Game Studio community for the Rob Blanc trilogy. He then created another AGS game, The Trials of Odysseus Kent, which was released on 30 September 2002. The Trials of Odysseus Kent was mentioned by PC Plus magazine as "AGS Showcase" in the November 2003 issue. He also helped found the collaborative Reality-on-the-Norm series by creating the first game, Lunchtime of the Damned. The series has gone on to have over 50 episodes since. In 2003, Croshaw created a total conversion mod for Duke Nukem 3D: Atomic Edition called Age of Evil. Some of his later works experimented with the AGS engine to produce games in other genres than the point-and-click adventure games that AGS was designed for, such as Adventures in the Galaxy of Fantabulous Wonderment, and the 1213 series.

1213 and the Chzo Mythos games were both later released as special editions. These contain author's commentaries, extended endings, or even extended notes giving backstory. Croshaw allowed people to get these each time they donated over five U.S. dollars to his site, but as of July 2009 they were given out for free on his site, as he said he no longer relied on the donations as a means of support.

Croshaw writes his own games and their graphics and animation using Adobe Photoshop and Microsoft Paint, though he does not compose his own music.

Visual Basic (1998–2000)

Arthur Yahtzee Trilogy
A series of adventure games for Microsoft Windows 95 in the 1990s that were written in Visual Basic 3 and largely drawn in Microsoft Paint during Croshaw's high school years, inspired by his schoolmate Michael Dodson's Red Dwarf games, with the first being released on 1January 1998. They star his "signature character", from which his Internet alias is derived. In Friday: Death to Arthur Yahtzee, a group of mutants whom Arthur once defeated are back and out to get him. In Saturday: Arthur's Odyssey, Yahtzee has to face forces trying to mess with time, a quest that leads into  Yesterday: The D-Gate where Arthur faces the villain Cathode (and helped by Anode). He reveals himself to be the one responsible for all Arthur's troubles in the previous games and is now determined to gain the power to control travel between dimensions. The game ends with Arthur destroying the entire Multiverse in his quest to stop him.

These games were created before Croshaw had a career (or, indeed, his own website), and were hosted on the site of a friend of his; when that site went down, they were hosted to Croshaw's Fully Ramblomatic site. A text adventure game, Arthur Yahtzee: The Curse of Hell's Cheesecake, was also created (however it is not considered part of the actual trilogy).

Adventure Game Studio (2000–2007)

Rob Blanc Trilogy
The Rob Blanc trilogy is a series of adventure games for MS-DOS that follow the adventures of the fictional character Robert "Rob" Blanc, an unassuming English chip shop worker who is abducted by the High Ones, the two secret rulers of reality. He is told that he is to become the "Defender of the Universe" to provide a counterbalance to all the evil being done in the galaxy. In Rob BlancI: Better Days of a Defender of the Universe, he is sent to an alien spaceship to find out what happened to the crew, and prove himself as a worthy defender of the universe. The second game, Rob Blanc II: Planet of the Pasteurised Pestilence, features Rob returning to Earth while the High Ones construct his ship. While there, he notices a green-haired teenage male, Paul Grewald, following him, and inside an elevator, both of them find that they have been sent into outer space. Landing on an alien world, they find that the natives believe them to be the ones prophesied to cure a great plague which is enveloping the planet, and are thus forced to live up to the legend. The third and final game, Rob Blanc III: The Temporal Terrorists, begins on Rob's spaceship where he and Paul, now his sidekick, are finally ready to start defending the universe. Their first mission soon comes: somebody is removing all the time from the universe, and Rob and Paul must find and assemble the parts of the Reaman Time Drive (RTD) to find out who is responsible for it. All the games follow the same point-and-click interface typical of the AGS engine they were built on, with most of the puzzles involving the finding of objects. The series' humour is inspired by The Hitchhikers Guide to the Galaxy and Red Dwarf.

The Trials of Odysseus Kent
After finishing the Arthur Yahtzee and Rob Blanc trilogies, Croshaw had stated that he was done with making adventure games. In 2002, however, Croshaw wrote and released The Trials of Odysseus Kent, inspired by the Monkey Island series. The game follows Odysseus Kent, a mysterious drifter and treasure hunter who dresses like he's from the Regency era. Kent has come to a small village community in search of a bonanza called the Lost Treasure of Randolph McBoing. The game uses a traditional point-and-click interface places a higher emphasis on visual graphics rather than message boxes. The game was to be continued in a sequel entitled The Rise and Fall of Odysseus Kent, however, Croshaw lost interest and the game remains unfinished.

Adventures in the Galaxy of Fantabulous Wonderment

Released in 2005, Adventures in the Galaxy of Fantabulous Wonderment features cynical science fiction humour similar to Sierra On-Line's Space Quest, but mixes adventure elements with turn-based space combat, resource trading and space exploration gameplay mechanisms reminiscent of space simulator titles like Star Control and Wing Commander: Privateer. The game is both a parody of and a tribute to science fiction games and films. For instance, a major plot point is the deployment of Redshirts (an obvious homage to Star Trek's disposable red-shirted crew members), who are used as cannon fodder when the situation planet-side is deemed too dangerous for the ship's crew. The easily replaceable Redshirts invariably die, often in gruesome and darkly comic ways. Although not a part of the series proper, the game is set in the Rob Blanc science fiction universe, following the disappearance of the "Defender of the Universe" and the chaos that followed. The game was to be continued in a sequel, Escape from the Dimension of Insidulous Cruellitude; however, Croshaw lost interest, and the game remains uncompleted.

Chzo Mythos

5 Days a Stranger, 7 Days a Skeptic, Trilby's Notes, and 6Days a Sacrifice are the four parts of a horror series that were released in 2003, 2004, 2006, and 2007 respectively. In 5Days a Stranger, the player controls the shady cat burglar Trilby, who stumbles across a demonic force that manifests itself as a masked killer in the tradition of Jason Voorhees or Michael Myers, while finding himself one of a group of strangers thrown together in an abandoned mansion and being picked off one by one. 7Days a Skeptic emulates the claustrophobic horror of Alien following a spaceship crew that finds a mysterious artefact floating in space, four hundred years after the events of 5Days a Stranger. Trilby's Notes, set in a hotel which exists in both the real world and a horrific alternate dimension in the style of Silent Hill, goes back to flesh out the origin of the cursed African idol from the other games. 6Days a Sacrifice is the final episode of the John DeFoe tetralogy. It links all its three previous episodes and completes the story of Chzo and John DeFoe.

While the first two games use the point-and-click interface typical of adventure games, Trilby's Notes requires the player to move with the keyboard and type commands with a text parser, similar to the early Sierra On-Line King's Quest series.

A wrapped version for Linux was released in 2010 to icculus.org, later updated to use the open source version of AGS in 2015.

1213 series
1213 is a trilogy of horror science-fiction games. The episodes tell the story of the suffering and eventual escape of an amnesiac victim of experimentation, code-named 1213, from his cell, freed by his unseen tormentor. On escaping, 1213 sees that the facility's other guinea pigs, all similarly named to himself, have also escaped and have been turned into zombies, slaughtering the employees. 1213 is notable for reproducing the traditional platformer experience using an engine originally designed to be used in the production of point-and-click adventure games. Simply animated, many elements of the game reflect the original Prince of Persia gameplay mechanics, though it incorporates aspects of gunplay found in Another World and Flashback: The Quest for Identity, the latter of which he has written a sixteen-chapter Let's Play of.

Trilby: The Art of Theft
Set two years before 5 Days a Stranger, though unrelated to the John DeFoe storyline in the other Chzo Mythos games, Trilby: The Art of Theft is a mission-based platform game released in 2007. Like 1213, Trilby: The Art of Theft was made in AGS and features similar gameplay, though with less emphasis on combat and more on stealth. Unusual for a Croshaw game, Trilby: The Art of Theft is gameplay based rather than story based like the majority of his work. The game follows Trilby, years before any encounter with the supernatural, as a young gentleman thief whose identity is compromised after he is caught returning from a job. Trilby must loot various buildings in missions while avoiding guards, lasers and security cameras. To deal with being detected, Trilby is equipped with a utility umbrella that contains a taser to knockout aware guards, though if he is detected too many times the level ends.

Game Maker (2012–present)

Poacher
Poacher was released on 5 April 2012. It is a Metroidvania style non-linear platformer starring Derek Badger, a poacher who travels underground to save a gamekeeper from hordes of demonic rabbits, with the assistance of a spirit. Their actions inadvertently break a longstanding treaty between the spirits and their enemies, the Dark Ones. Eventually, he must resolve difficulties between the two factions to prevent war from breaking out. The game was his first to be made in Game Maker, and was released to positive reception.

The Consuming Shadow
The Consuming Shadow was announced in November 2013 on Croshaw's personal website where the beta version was made available for download. He updated the game continually until 26 June, when he uploaded the trailer of the final version. On 28 July 2015, two editions were made available to purchase on both through Humble Bundle and the Mac App Store, with a Steam version later being green lit. The special edition of the game included the e-book releases of Croshaw's novels Mogworld and Jam.

Hatfall
In February 2015, Croshaw announced a new game titled Hatfall, based on his Zero Punctuation series, that he would design. The game was later released in July 2015 and is available on IOS, Android and PC. The game is advertised as "Zero Punctuation's official hat-putting-on simulator" and reflects the series' humour and minimalist design.

12 Games in 12 Months
Starting in May 2019 as part of his Dev Diary series, Croshaw pledged to prototype a different game design each month for twelve months with a video diary released every fortnight.

May 2019: Preflight Panic – inspired by Papers, Please, the player is a flight attendant who must check and correct each passenger or else the plane explodes on take-off.
June 2019: BRTV – the player is an executive producer running a reality show about a battle royale scenario.
July 2019: Upbeat – a platform game mixed with a rhythm game where the player must move along with the beat.
August 2019: The Life of Erich Zann – a horror game inspired by the short story The Music of Erich Zann by H.P. Lovecraft.
September 2019: Hogpocalypse Sow – a shooter game where the player must use two different colored guns to fend off waves of correspondingly colored feral pigs.
October 2019: The Cleaner – a stealth game where the player diverts suspicion before committing an assassination, whereupon they must clean the room before time runs out.
November 2019: The Button That Ruins Everything – an incremental game where the player watches the story of a dog as their life unfolds and goes through random scenarios, whilst trying to keep an orange cat from pressing the titular "Button That Ruins Everything".
December 2019: Casey Joint – a game made to simulate fake movie hacking, where the player must work together with Trilby to pull off a series of heists through hacking objects in the environment, which is based around mashing random keys on the keyboard.
January 2020: Hold the Phone – a game designed to simulate the stress of being on hold for a phone call while managing other tasks.
February 2020: Something's in the Sea – a horror game about collecting items from the bottom of the sea while evading a giant monster dwelling under the water.
March 2020: The Magic Poo Machine – a game inspired by "Night Shift", which involves building a contraption that will transform the extraordinary matter excreted by a dog into various products to be shipped for profit.
April 2020: Bunker Bustin' – a game about an evil dictator locked in a bunker who must kill himself and his subordinates by ricocheting bullets off the bunker walls.

Starstruck Vagabond
During the first season of his Dev Diary series, Yahtzee mentioned stalled progress on a game he had been working on, which he described to be similar to Stardew Valley, but set in space with the player character being a cargo ship captain. Audience reaction to the footage and concept was positive, and Yahtzee resumed work on the game in the second season of Dev Diary, which almost completely focused on this game's development. The name "Starstruck Vagabond" was announced in episode 3. The first build of the game was released for public testing after episode 12.

Writing

Webcomics
On 20 December 2000 Yahtzee started a webcomic known as Yahtzee Takes on the World, which contained characters from his Arthur Yahtzee and Rob Blanc trilogies. The comic ended its run on 22 September 2002. In addition, he also produced several other webcomics; The Adventures of Angular Mike, Cowboy Comics!, and Chris and Trilby which is based on the characters Chris Quinn from Age of Evil and Trilby from Chzo Mythos. Yahtzee has since openly disowned his comics, attributing it to a "dark time" in his life, although they are still hosted online to read.

Novels
Croshaw's website hosts two unpublished novels: Articulate Jim: A Search for Something, a pirate-themed in part work; and Fog Juice, his 2005 "National Novel Writing Month" entry. In addition, he has also written two unpublished tie-in short stories for Chzo Mythos. All of his published novels have been released in audiobook format, narrated by Croshaw himself.

Mogworld
On 23 October 2009, The Escapist announced Croshaw's first novel, Mogworld, "the story of Jim, who, sixty years after dying in a magic-school mishap, is wrenched back to life by a renegade necromancer". Croshaw stated that the novel would be released on 19 August 2010 while the Mogworld profile on the Dark Horse Books website claims it was released on 8September. The title is a reference to the massively multiplayer online role-playing games genre name which Croshaw believes is unwieldy.

Machine of Death
In the year 2010, on October 26, 2010, the independently published short story anthology Machine of Death was published, containing a short story by Croshaw.

Jam
On 26 December 2010, Croshaw revealed that he was working on a second novel. "It's about an apocalypse. WITH JAM IN IT." On 25 April 2012, Croshaw announced the novel, titled Jam. It was published by Dark Horse Books and released on 23 October 2012. The concept for the novel can be seen in the Zero Punctuation review of the survival horror game Dead Island where he says that people would not be able to cope if civilization ends in any other way than a zombie apocalypse. He then mentions the idea of the entire world getting covered in "carnivorous jam". Croshaw has stated that Jam is tangentially related to Mogworld but is not a sequel.

Will Save the Galaxy for Food 

On 25 August 2016 Croshaw announced on his blog that a third novel would be released on 1February 2017. He had previously mentioned that he was working on a third novel, a science fiction comedy, on his Let's Drown Out video series. The novel, Will Save the Galaxy for Food, is set in a universe in which the age of space exploration is cut short by the invention of teleportation technology with limitless range and focuses on a former space hero who finds himself embroiled in a dangerous conspiracy. A short excerpt from the novel was included in Croshaw's video game Hatfall, playing in the background of one of the minigames in a spoof of the Star Wars Opening Crawl.

Differently Morphous 

On 7 March 2018 Croshaw announced on his blog he'd released a fourth novel called Differently Morphous. It was released as an Audible original first, with a print edition coming later in the year. The novel is about a group of individuals from the Ministry of Occultism needing to track down a magical serial killer while dealing with the public scrutiny of our modern politically correct society.

Will Destroy the Galaxy for Cash
On 21 September 2019, Croshaw announced on his blog that a direct sequel to Will Save the Galaxy for Food was slated for release on Audible.com on 26 September 2019. Croshaw specifically stated that he was leery of sequels and serials, because he remembered as a kid only finding books 2 and 4 of certain series, but he also mentioned that this lack of availability was a non-issue in the age of digital media. He also explains that "saving [himself] the trouble of coming up with new characters was nice." The novel tells the story of an out-of-work space hero going by the name Dashford Pierce, as a set of complications once again turn his life upside down.

Existentially Challenged
On 10 December 2021, Croshaw announced on his blog that a sequel to Differently Morphous was available. Existentially Challenged is initially only available as an Audible Original, with plans for a print edition from Dark Horse in the future.

Involvement with other games
On 5 July 2011, Croshaw admitted in his Extra Punctuation column that at one point during its long development, he was given an offer by 3D Realms developer Brian Hook to write the script for Duke Nukem Forever. This was a response to a fan's question, following Croshaw's official review of the game, regarding a fact brought up in a 23 June episode of the TWiT Video Game Show. In the episode, Duke Nukem Forever developer Jay Brushwood claimed that Hook pushed for Croshaw's involvement in the project and that his piece stood out as being the funniest among the samples sent in by other writers. However, lead designer George Broussard rejected Croshaw's script for being, according to Brushwood, "too out there" and untrue to the Duke Nukem character; Croshaw later added in his column that it didn't match the game's "tone".

According to the Extra Punctuation article, his short audition script wrote Duke Nukem as an ironic character; seeing that it was the only way to successfully present the overly-macho character to the current market. Croshaw added that he never talked about the offer up to that point due to possible "unspoken" non-disclosure action and because he didn't think the whole story was worth mentioning to the public. He elaborated further when he and Gabriel Morton played Duke Nukem Forever on Let's Drown Out, calling Duke Nukem a "dinosaur" and pointing out that the character was "part of a culture that no longer existed".

During his trip to E3 2019, Yahtzee revealed that he did minor writing work on Watch Dogs: Legion. He explained that he was hired early in development to "punch up the dialogue for the AI support character [Bagley]".

Other projects

Podcast and YouTube projects
Since 13 April 2011, Croshaw has hosted podcasts on his personal website. The podcasts consist of unscripted banter between him and co-speaker Gabriel Morton regarding various subjects. The format is show and tell: Croshaw and Morton each bring three objects to discuss. The audio files were also posted on SoundCloud, but have since been deleted, until a fan brought them back on YouTube.

In February 2012, Croshaw and Gabriel Morton began producing Let's Play videos of various older video games and uploading them to Croshaw's YouTube channel yahtzee19. While playing, the two discuss current news in gaming and films. As of July 2019, more than 90 games have been played in the series.

The "Show and Tell Podcasts" have since ended with Croshaw and Morton hybridizing their Let's Play series with podcast topics. Titled Let's Drown Out, Morton and Yahtzee play a "boring game" of one's choosing (alternating with each episode) and talk about current events in the video game world. The series was done weekly and posted on Croshaw's YouTube channel until being tentatively put on hiatus in December 2014, due to Croshaw and Morton feeling the format had grown stale. Since then, Let's Drown Out has been interspersed with their earlier format of Let's Play recordings of Adventure games, as well as a newer series of retrospective gameplay commentaries on Croshaw's own, earlier games, titled The Ego Review. In the series, Croshaw and Morton discuss the games' writing and plot holes. Croshaw also talks about the feedback the games got. The format has been rearranged to allow the two to, in Croshaw's words, "play whatever the fuck we like and talk about whatever the fuck we like". Due to Yahtzee's move to the United States, his podcast series "Lets Drown Out" came to an end; with the final episode covering the Portal2 Co-op campaign.

Game Damage 
Game Damage was a planned game-themed television series pilot co-starring Croshaw with Matt Burgess and Guy "Yug" Blomberg from the website Australian Gamer. The pilot was released on YouTube on 15 December 2008. A website was set up to promote the series. The show was supposed to feature gaming news, comedy sketches, reviews of MMORPGs and three special reports, one of which involved Croshaw in a discussion of the adventure game genre. On 3October 2009, an updated pilot was uploaded to YouTube and the Game Damage website, showing new sketches and appearances at Supanova 2009.

There was little to no published information about Game Damage afterwards. In 2011, Croshaw was asked if Game Damage was still being worked on, to which he simply replied "Nope."

The Mana Bar

Croshaw was one of the four founders of The Mana Bar, an Australian cocktail bar and video gaming lounge. The bar was founded in Brisbane, with a second venue opened in Melbourne in 2011. The bar intended to continue to spread around Australia and potentially internationally, however, as of May 2015, all venues have closed their doors.

Past works on The Escapist

Extra Consideration 
Extra Consideration was a discussion column featuring Croshaw & other members of The Escapist that ran briefly from February to September 2011.

Jim & Yahtzee's Rhymedown Spectacular 
In addition to Zero Punctuation, Croshaw has also starred in a series on The Escapist titled Jim & Yahtzee's Rhymedown Spectacular alongside former Escapist personality Jim Sterling. The weekly series consisted of an original piece of video game themed poetry each from Croshaw and Sterling. Unlike his other shows, Croshaw presented himself on camera the entire time. The series aired weekly from 17 April 2013, to 28 May 2014.

Uncivil War 
Additionally, Croshaw and Sterling briefly starred in a competitive series titled Uncivil War, where they play various games with obscure rules attached to decide the victor. The first season lasted from July to November in 2014, with Sterling being the winner. There were plans for a second season, but were cancelled after Sterling left The Escapist.

Judging by the Cover 
In July 2015, Croshaw started another video series for The Escapist called Judging by the Cover, where Croshaw sarcastically reviews video games and movies simply by looking at their box art or cover. This series ended in October 2017, with Croshaw stating in a later documentary that he felt he "was repeating himself".

Yahtzee's E3 2019 Adventure 
For E3 2019, Yahtzee traveled to the expo on behalf of The Escapist with the Gameumentary staff to document the entire show. The Gameumentary team also used their time with Croshaw to create a mini-documentary about Zero Punctuation.

Personal life
Born the younger of two brothers, Croshaw attended Eastlands Primary School after which he attended Abbots Farm Middle School and finally Lawrence Sheriff School. Here he made his first adventure game before dropping  out of secondary school. At the age of 20, he moved to Australia to pursue new career opportunities. As of 2013, he did not often contact his brother, while his parents disapproved of his game-critic career, as they wanted him to enroll into higher education. In August 2016, Yahtzee moved to San Francisco.

As of July 2018, he is now married to his long-time girlfriend Kess. Croshaw became a father in January 2020 to a daughter.

References

External links

 
Fully Ramblomatic Ben Croshaw's official website
Zero Punctuation on The Escapist
AGS Games Award winners
Yahtzee Croshaw on Twitter
Yahtzee on Adventure Game Studio Wiki

Living people
1983 births
People from Rugby, Warwickshire
Adventure Game Studio
Audiobook narrators
English bloggers
English expatriates in Australia
English expatriates in the United States
English male journalists
English male voice actors
English male short story writers
English male novelists
English fantasy writers
English science fiction writers
English comedy writers
British Internet celebrities
British humorists
Video game critics
Let's Players
English YouTubers
British video game programmers
Drinking establishment owners
Writers from San Francisco
AGS Award winners
People educated at Lawrence Sheriff School
YouTube critics and reviewers